Frederic Lawrence Knowles was an American poet whose works included On Life's Stairway and Love Triumphant.

Life 
Knowles was born in Lawrence, Massachusetts, the son of Reverend Daniel C. Knowles, a Methodist minister, and Lucia M. (née Barrows) Knowles. He graduated from Tilton Seminary, now Tilton School, in 1890 and went on to attend Wesleyan University. At Wesleyan, he was an editor for the Wesleyan Literary Monthly and was elected to Phi Beta Kappa. He was also a member of the Psi Upsilon fraternity. He graduated from Wesleyan in 1894. In 1896, he graduated from Harvard University with an AB. After leaving Harvard, he taught at his alma mater, Tilton Seminary, where his father was Head of School, for a few years before becoming a manuscript reader for Houghton, Mifflin, & Co.

Knowles died on September 20, 1905 in Roxbury from typhoid fever.

Works
 On Life's Stairway (1900)

References

1869 births
1905 deaths
American male poets
Wesleyan University alumni
Harvard University alumni
Tilton School alumni